Danishmend Gazi, Danishmend Taylu, or Dānishmand Aḥmad Ghāzī (died 1085), was the Turkmen general of the Seljuks and later founder of the beylik of Danishmends. After the Turkic advance into Anatolia that followed the Battle of Manzikert, his dynasty controlled the north-central regions in Anatolia.

Life
The defeat of the Byzantine army at the Battle of Manzikert allowed the Turks, including forces loyal to Danishmend Gazi, to occupy nearly all of Anatolia. Danishmend Gazi and his forces took as their lands central Anatolia, conquering the cities of Neocaesarea, Tokat, Sivas, and Euchaita.

According to Michael the Syrian, he ruled Cappadocia in 1085, and most likely died the same year. He was succeeded by his son Gazi Gümüshtigin.

Legend
Danishmend Gazi is the central figure in the Danishmendnâme ("Tale of Danishmend"), a 13th-century Turkish-language epic romance. In this allegory, events from the life of Danishmend Gazi are blended with the legendary exploits of the 8th-century Arab warrior Sayyid Battal Gazi and of the Persian hero Abu Muslim of the early Abbasid period.

The legends that comprise Danishmendnâme were compiled from Turkish oral tradition for the first time by order of the Seljuk Sultan Kayqubad I, a century after Danishmend's death. The final form that reached our day is a compendium that was put together under the instructions of the early 15th century Ottoman sultan Murad II.

Name
There is also some confusion on his name and divergence among names used by scholars. He had the same name as his son, Gümüştekin. The father is often referred to shortly as Danishmend Gazi, while his son is called Gazi Gümüştekin. Furthermore, the Danishmend dynasty is also cited as having a family tie to the Seljuk dynasty. He was the maternal uncle to the Seljuk ruler Suleiman ibn Qutulmish.

Notes

References
 (limited preview) 
Irene Melikoff (1960): Danishmendname La Geste de Melik Danishmend, translation and introduction to a Turkish epic of the 13th century
 

1084 deaths
Muslims of the First Crusade
Turkic rulers
History of Tokat
Year of birth unknown
11th-century rulers in Asia
12th-century rulers in Asia
11th-century Turkic people
Danishmend dynasty
Founding monarchs